Wahab Ackwei (born 19 October 1996) is a Ghanaian professional footballer who plays as a defender for USL Championship club Rio Grande Valley FC.

Career

Inter Allies
Ackwei made his debut in Ghanaian professional football during the 2015 season with Inter Allies FC in the Ghanaian Division One. Ackwei scored his first goal for Inter Allies on 20 March 2017 in a 1–0 victory over Tema Youth F.C. On 28 June 2017 he scored the loan goal for Inter Allies in a 1–0 victory over Bechem United. On 8 October 2017 Ackwei scored his team's opening goal from the penalty spot in a 2–0 victory over Medeama S.C. At the conclusion of the 2017 season in which he scored 3 goals in 23 appearances it was reported that clubs from Europe and Major League Soccer were in pursuit of the defender.

Ackwei played at the club for three years before leaving at the expiration of his contract during December 2017. After leaving Inter Allies, it was reported that Ackwei had an offer from 
Accra Hearts of Oak after a deal with Danish club Viborg FF failed to materialize.

New York Red Bulls II
On 14 February 2018 it was announced that Ackwei had signed with New York Red Bulls II.

Richmond Kickers 
In March 2019, the Richmond Kickers signed Ackwei.

Loudoun United 
Ackwei signed with Loudoun United on 11 February 2021.

Rio Grande Valley FC
On 11 February 2022, Ackwei moved to USL Championship side Rio Grande Valley FC. On May 5, 2022, Ackwei scored his first goal for RGV during a 3–2 loss to Colorado Springs Switchbacks FC.

Career statistics

Honours
Individual
USL Championship All League Second Team: 2022

References

External links
 
 Wahab Ackwei at Inter Allies FC
 
 Wahab Ackwei at WorldFootball.com 

1996 births
Living people
Ghanaian footballers
Association football defenders
New York Red Bulls II players
People from Accra
Richmond Kickers players
Loudoun United FC players
Rio Grande Valley FC Toros players
USL Championship players
USL League One players